Adeesha Thilanchana (born 23 June 1995) is a Sri Lankan cricketer. He made his first-class debut for Sri Lanka Army Sports Club in the 2014–15 Premier Trophy on 16 January 2015.

References

External links
 

1995 births
Living people
Sri Lankan cricketers
Sinhalese Sports Club cricketers
Sri Lanka Army Sports Club cricketers
Place of birth missing (living people)